Avargan (also Romanized as Āvargān and Owregān; also known as Auragūn, Āvardgān, Āverd Kān, and Organ) is a village in Chaghakhor Rural District of Boldaji District, Borujen County, Chaharmahal and Bakhtiari province, Iran. At the 2006 census, its population was 2,553 in 535 households. The following census in 2011 counted 2,477 people in 640 households. The latest census in 2016 showed a population of 2,041 people in 636 households; it was the largest village in its rural district. The village is populated by Lurs.

References 

Borujen County

Populated places in Chaharmahal and Bakhtiari Province

Populated places in Borujen County
[[Category:Luri settlements in Chaharmahal and Bakhtiari Province]]